Vincent William Ryan  (8 December 1816 – 11 January 1888), was the inaugural Bishop of Mauritius  from 1854 to 1869.

He was educated at Magdalen Hall, Oxford, and ordained in 1842 On his return from Mauritius he became Rector of Bedale.
After holding for just four months the archdeaconry of Suffolk, Ryan became rector of St. Nicholas, Guildford, and commissary of Winchester. In May 1870 he was transferred to the vicarage of Bradford, Yorkshire. He was rural dean from 1870 to 1876, and in 1875 became archdeacon of Craven and commissary to the bishop of Ripon. In 1872 he went on a special mission to Mauritius. In August 1880 Ryan became vicar of St. Peter's, Bournemouth, and in 1881 rector of Middleham, from where he moved in 1883 to the rectory of Stanhope, Durham.

He died at Stanhope on 11 January 1888.

References

Attribution

1816 births
Alumni of Magdalen College, Oxford
Anglican bishops of Mauritius
Archdeacons of Craven
Archdeacons of Suffolk
1888 deaths
British Mauritius people
People from Stanhope, County Durham